Granotoma krausei is a species of sea snail, a marine gastropod mollusk in the family Mangeliidae.

There is one subspecies : Granotoma krausei regulus  (W.H. Dall, 1919) (synonym: Oenopota regulus W.H. Dall, 1919.

Description
The length of the shell varies between 7 mm and 12 mm.

(Original description) The small shell is elongate and ovate, compressed. it has about six whorls and a rather large smooth protoconch. The transverse sculpture of, on the body whorl, consists of about twenty- six broad flattened waves, strongly flexed, most elevated over the fasciole, and becoming narrower and less prominent anteriorly. The outer angle of the anal notch is rather prominent and makes an angulation especially of the earlier whorls, which fall away in a peculiarly flattened manner to the suture. The longitudinal sculpture consists of fine sharp grooves, which pass uniformly over the ribs and interspaces, are somewhat stronger on the earlier whorls and very uniform, only a little coarser on the siphonal canal. The notch is more marked than usual in this genus. The shell is pure white and the epidermis is grayish yellow and quite strong.

Distribution
This species occurs in the Sea of Japan, the Bering Sea and off Alaska and British Columbia.

References

External links
 
  Tucker, J.K. 2004 Catalog of recent and fossil turrids (Mollusca: Gastropoda). Zootaxa 682:1–1295.
  Gulbin, Vladimir V. "Review of the Shell-bearing Gastropods in the Russian Waters of the East Sea (Sea of Japan). III. Caenogastropoda: Neogastropoda." The Korean Journal of Malacology 25.1 (2009): 51–70.

krausei
Gastropods described in 1887